Hyenas is a 1992 Senegalese film adaptation of Friedrich Dürrenmatt's Swiss-German satirical tragicomedy play The Visit (1956), directed by Djibril Diop Mambéty. The intimate story of love and revenge parallels a critique of neocolonialism and African consumerism. It was entered into the 1992 Cannes Film Festival.

Plot
Hyenas (Hyenas) tells the story of Linguere Ramatou, an aging, wealthy woman who revisits her home village of Colobane. Linguere offers a disturbing proposition to the people of Colobane and lavishes luxuries upon them to persuade them. This embittered woman, "as rich as the World Bank", will bestow upon Colobane a fortune in exchange for the murder of Dramaan Drameh, a local shopkeeper who abandoned her after a love affair and her illegitimate pregnancy when she was seventeen.

Cast
 Ami Diakhate as Linguère Ramatou
 Djibril Diop Mambéty as Gaana
 Mansour Diouf as Dramaan Drameh
 Calgou Fall as the priest
 Faly Gueye as Mme. Drameh
 Mamadou Mahourédia Gueye as the Mayor
 Issa Ramagelissa Samb as the professor

Critical response
Critical response to the film was mostly positive. Rotten Tomatoes reported that 69% of critics gave the film positive reviews based upon a sample of 159, with an average score of 3.7 out of 5. Hyenas was nominated for the Golden Palm Award at the 1992 Cannes Film Festival.

 "A timeless story...The strong story line and fine ensemble acting provide a faster, more easily assimilated rhythm than many African films." - Variety	
 "This pungent film adaptation's change of locale lends the tale a new political dimension...(Mambety) inflects the grim drama with an edge of carnival humor. This film carries a sting!" - The New York Times
 "This wicked tale, told with wit and irony, has all the ingredients of a crowd-pleaser." - The Village Voice
 "Funnier and warmer than Dürrenmatt ever dared to be but with the tale's bleak, ominous edges still in evidence." - New York Newsday

References
Notes

Bibliography

External links
 
 
 
 

1992 films
1992 comedy films
Senegalese comedy films
Wolof-language films
Films based on works by Friedrich Dürrenmatt
Films directed by Djibril Diop Mambéty
Films shot in Senegal